Etlingera apus-hang is a monocotyledonous plant species described by Lim Chong Keat. Etlingera apus-hang is part of the genus Etlingera and the family Zingiberaceae. No subspecies are listed in the Catalog of Life.

References 

apus-hang